Otu-Jeremi is a town in Ughelli South LGA of Delta State, Nigeria. The Nigeria Gas Plant is located here. It is the headquarters of Ughelli South LGA.

References

Populated places in Delta State